The 1st Air Squadron (第一飛行戦隊　Dai-ichi-hikō sentai) was a flying unit of the Imperial Japanese Army Air Service. The unit was established on 5 July 1938 at Kagamigahara, Japan. The unit saw service in Manchuria during the Manchuria Incident, China during the Second Sino-Japanese War and Burma, Netherlands East Indies, Indochina, Rabaul, Solomon Islands, New Guinea, Philippines, Formosa and Japan during World War II. The unit was disbanded at Takahagi, Japan in late 1945.

History 
The 1st Air Squadron can trace its roots back to the First World War, where the Imperial Japanese Army used early aircraft in their conquest of German held islands. The "Temporary Air Force" as it was known was primarily used at the Siege of Tsingtao and would ultimately be disbanded in January 1915. Soon after, its successor the 1st Aviation Battalion was established in October of the same year. The original unit was then upgraded in size to the 1st Air Regiment on June 1, 1925, in conjunction with the inauguration of the Army Air Forces Headquarters, which controlled the air force. 

In 1915, the "Provisional Air Force," which had been formed during World War I, was scheduled to increase its air power. This includes the independence of the air force and a creation of ten squadrons composing of six fighter squadrons, two light bomber squadrons, and two heavy bomber squadrons. As a result, the 1st Flying Regiment, initially a battalion in size, was assigned two reconnaissance aircraft squadrons bring its total to two reconnaissance aircraft squadrons and two fighter squadrons. Later, the regiment was renamed to the 1st Air Squadron due to the separation of ground and air units within the Japanese army.

Aircraft
Ki-27 (1939 - May 1942)
Ki-43 I (July 1942 - August 1943)
Ki-43 II (September 1943 - April 1944)
Ki-84 (April 1944 - August 1945)

Bases
Kanchuerhmiao Nomonhan Jun 1939
Saienjo Nomonhan Jun 1939 Sep 1939
Sunjia near Harbin Oct 1939 Nov 1941
Kompong Trach, Cambodia Dec 1941
Singora Malaya Dec 1941 Jan 1942
Kuantan Malaya Jan 1942 Feb 1942
Tandjungkarang south Sumatra Feb 1942 Mar 1942
Toungoo, Burma Mar 1942 May 1942
Mingaladon, Burma May 1942
Akeno   Jul 1942 Aug 1942
Palembang, Sumatra, August 1942 - October 1942
Tourane, Indochina Oct 1942
Hanoi, Indochina Oct 1942
Singapore   Nov 1942 Dec 1942
Rabaul, New Britain Jan 1943 Aug 1943
Ballale, Solomon Islands, January 1943
Wewak, New Guinea, February 1943   (detached)
Lae, New Guinea,  March 1943
Wewak, New Guinea, April 1943 - August 1943
Osaka, Japan, September 1943 - November 1943
Mengguli   Nov 1943
Kashiwa near Tokyo Nov 1943 Oct 1944
Gan-no-su northern Kyushu Aug 1944 Sep 1944 (detached)
Clark Field, Luzon Oct 1944
Manapla Negros Oct 1944 Nov 1944
Shimodate Kanto district Nov 1944 Dec 1944
Porac, Luzon Dec 1944 Jan 1945
Chaochou, Formosa Jan 1945 Feb 1945
Shimodate, Kanto district Mar 1945 Apr 1945
Takahagi, Kanto district Apr 1945 Aug 1945

References

Units and formations of the Imperial Japanese Army Air Service
Military units and formations established in 1938
Military units and formations disestablished in 1945